Peile is a surname, and may refer to:

 Alfred James Peile (1868–1948), artillery officer, malacologist and conchologist 
 Anne Peile, writer 
 James Peile (1863–1940), Anglican priest 
 James Peile (administrator) (1833–1906), administrator in India
 John Peile (1838–1910), English philologist
 Kinsey Peile (1862–1934), British playwright